Patagonia National Park (Spanish: Parque Patagonia) is a National Park in the Aysén Region of Chile, once a private nature reserve operated as a public-access park, it was donated to the government of Chile by Tompkins Conservation in 2018.

The heart of the park is the Chacabuco Valley, a biologically important east–west valley that forms a pass over the Andes Mountains and a transition zone between the Patagonian steppe grasslands of Argentinian Patagonia and the southern beech forests of Chilean Patagonia to the west. It is located between the General Carrera Lake to the north and Cochrane Lake to the south, and extends to the Argentinian border to the east. The park has an infrastructure of trails, campgrounds, and a visitor center.

Parque Patagonia was created by Conservacion Patagonica, a nonprofit incorporated in California and founded in 2000 by Kris Tompkins, to protect Patagonia's wildlands and ecosystems. Conservacion Patagonica has since merged into Tompkins Conservation.

On January 29, 2018, Chilean President Michelle Bachelet and Kris Tompkins, President of Tompkins Conservation, signed a decree creating 5 national parks, one of which is Patagonia National Park.

History & Creation of Patagonia National Park 
The Patagonia National Park Project consists of four major program areas: buying land, restoring biodiversity, building public access, and engaging communities.

Buying Land 
Originally one of the region's largest sheep ranches, Estancia Valle Chacabuco changed hands many times over the past century. British explorer Lucas Bridges established the area as ranchland in 1908, but through the efforts of the Eduardo Frei Montalva administration to redistribute wealth, the land was expropriated and divided between several local families in 1964. The land was reclaimed once again, this time by the Augusto Pinochet administration, and then sold to Belgian landowner Francoise de Smet in 1980.

Kris and Doug Tompkins first visited the Chacabuco Valley in 1995. CONAF (Chile's National Forest Corporation) had listed the Chacabuco Valley as a top conservation priority for over 30 years, due to its unique array of native ecosystems. After two decades of declining profits, in 2004, Conservacion Patagonica (now called Tompkins Conservation) purchased the  Estancia Valle Chacabuco from de Smet and began purchasing smaller holdings from willing sellers in the Chacabuco Valley, with the goal of creating a continuous reserve to meet the edges of the nearby Jeinimeni and Tamango National Reserves.

Restoring Biodiversity 
The Chacabuco Valley, heart of Patagonia National Park, was for generations a vast sheep and cattle ranch, with almost 25,000 animals being raised on the land in a single year. The native grasslands were degraded by years of intense livestock grazing, leading to patchy desertification of the soils, and to the decline of wildlife populations that are native to the grasslands. With the purchase of the Estancia in 2004, Conservación Patagónica (CP) began working to remove fencing and reseed former pastures with native grasses, opening up the land to the return of native species such as the guanaco, and the endangered huemul deer. Recovery of the huemul is a top priority for the organization, which is conducting projects to monitor and protect the park's population of 100-200 animals, one of the largest known surviving populations on earth.

 Ecosystem Restoration:

Patagonia has suffered its share of ecological abuse: intensive sheep ranching on sandy, arid soils has resulted in widespread desertification. In the transition from sheep ranch to national park, Conservación Patagónica aimed to reverse these damages, restore productive habitat, and create a model of ecosystem restoration for Patagonia. The grasslands recovery program, launched in 2004, began with removing almost all livestock. Conservación Patagónica's volunteer program performed the bulk of the work of ecosystem restoration. As of 2011, they removed over half of the 640 kilometres (400 mi) of habitat-fragmenting ranch fencing. Volunteers also collected seeds from native coiron grasses, which professional ecosystem restoration workers used to reseed heavily damaged areas.
 Wildlife Recovery:

Conservación Patagónica's large-scale ecosystem restoration work, now carried out by Rewilding Chile, serves as the foundation for targeted species-specific programs, such as the effort to monitor and protect the endangered and emblematic huemul deer. As wildness returns to this vast area, the populations of keystone species are finding a new equilibrium. With livestock gone, grasslands are producing more and better quality food for a range of herbivores, which have access to prime habitat and can roam freely without fences. Wildlife recovery programs take this ecosystem-level transition as the jumping-off point for initiatives to protect keystone species. The huemul deer represents the top priority for the Patagonia National Park project: habitat loss, disease transmitted from livestock, hunting, and predation by domestic dogs have diminished its population to 1,500 individuals left on Earth. Tracking pumas with GPS collars uncovers new information about their predation patterns, home ranges, and movements—critical data given their proximity to the huemul deer population. Simultaneously, Conservación Patagónica implemented strategies, such as livestock guardian dogs, to mitigate predator-livestock conflicts.

Building Public Access 

One of CP's major focuses at the Patagonia National Park project was constructing durable, accessible public access infrastructure in order to provide visitors with a comfortable, engaging experience at the park. They built a park headquarters to include overnight accommodations, a restaurant, and a museum and visitor center. Architecture serves as a tool for social change: the aesthetic quality of park infrastructure conveys the cultural value of nature. Historic Patagonian buildings provide visitors with a vernacular architectural vocabulary tied to the region's history. These durable, solid, well-insulated buildings will require minimal upkeep and use local materials whenever possible: stone quarried on site and recycled wood. In addition, an innovative renewable energy system, composed of solar, wind, and mini-hydro generation facilities, make the park the world's first energy-independent park and minimize its carbon footprint.They also constructed trails and campgrounds to allow visitors to access the wilderness areas of the park, and to reach the neighboring reserves. By providing recreational opportunities, the park bolstered eco-tourism in the region, supports local businesses and communities while inspiring a deeper respect for nature in park visitors.

Engaging Communities 
From the start of the project, CP began developing collaborations with neighboring communities in order expand local visits to the park, to include area residents in employment opportunities, and to facilitate the development of a successful eco-tourism economy to the region as the park grows. Through engaging children and other members of the local community, the park will inspire awareness and dedication to conservation. Conservación Patagónica offered jobs to all former gauchos and developed programs to retrain them as park rangers and conservation workers. A school outreach program brings local children into the park to learn about endangered species such as the huemul deer, and the potential community benefits of conservation. Conservación Patagónica hosts an annual Huemul Festival and hike. Huemul scholarships have allowed more than fifty students to continue their studies.

Ecology 

Located in the transition zone between the arid steppe of Argentine Patagonia and the temperate southern beech forests of Chilean Patagonia, Parque Patagonia encompasses an array of ecosystems including grassland, riparian forest, and wetlands.

The dry steppe grasslands of Argentine Patagonia are characterized by minimal rainfall, cold, dry winds, and sandy soil. The Andean Mountains block moisture from flowing west, creating this arid area region. A number of plants have been able to adapt to this harsh environment, including shrubs like calafate, quilembay and yaoyín, and tuft grasses like flechilla and coirón poa. These grasslands support hardy animals such as the burrowing owl, the gray fox, tuco-tuco, mara, armadillos, various eagle and hawk species, and keystone predators like the puma. A wide range of animals thrive in the more habitable outskirts of the desert and around ephemeral lakes formed from the Andes' runoff, where trees and more nutritious aqueous grasses can grow.

Moving west and climbing the vertical gradient of the Andes Mountains, the park's flora and fauna changes notably. The landscape begins to transform into forests, which consists mostly of three species of the southern beech (Nothofagus) genus: lenga, ñire, and coiue. Here, rainfall can be very high, generating dense forests, full of nutrients from high leaf litter. These forests host 370 vascular plant genera, which are vital to the survival of the surrounding fauna. Some significant mammals include the endangered huemul deer, puma, red fox, and various species of bats. The forests of Parque Patagonia also contain a high diversity of bird species including the Andean condor, Magellanic woodpecker, spectacled duck, black-necked swan, pygmy owl, black-faced ibis, Chilean flamingo, Austral negrito, Southern lapwing and a range of amphibians and reptiles.

Throughout Patagonia, the guanaco, a large camelid that is a wild relative of the llama, is the most abundant herbivore. It feeds on 75% of all plant species in the Patagonian steppe. The guanaco acts as a keystone species: it prevents domination of grass species, acts as a disperser and fertilizes, and has high reproductive rates, providing food for local carnivores, especially pumas.

Although the park lies on the eastern side of the Andes, its glacier-fed streams and rivers run toward the Pacific Ocean. Their turquoise blue water is home to substantial populations of native fish such as perch (Percichthys trucha), pejerrey patagonico (Odontesthes hatcheri) and puyen (Galaxias maculatus). Atlantic salmon, as well as brook, brown, and rainbow trout, have been introduced to the area.

Visiting the Park 

Parque Patagonia is open October through April and only accessible by car. It is south of Coyhaique, Chile and north of Cochrane, Chile. The closest airport is Balmaceda, Chile (BBA). A 300 km drive from Balmaceda on the Carretera Austral is necessary to reach the park. As of March 2018, the Carretera Austral is only paved between Balmaceda and Cerro Castillo, Chile. The remaining portion of the highway to the park is unpaved. The ranger station in Sector Jeinimeni is easily reachable by car in about 1.5 hours from the town of Chile Chico.  It is a 2 to 5 day hike along the Aviles Trail to the Lodge at Valle Chacabuco.

The Lodge at Valle Chacabuco, at the center of the park, houses the park's main tourist infrastructure, including a lodge, restaurant, visitor center and employee housing.

There are also three campgrounds in the park.

Patagonia National Park in the Media 

 Our Great National Parks, a Netflix documentary series narrated by Barack Obama, showcased this park in its second episode "Chilean Patagonia".

Further reading

"Parque Patagonia: Leading a New Generation of Land Conservation". Will Carless. Patagonia, 2015. 
Video: "The Making of Parklands" by Tompkins Conservation. 
"Creating Patagonia National Park". Chris Spinder. CBS News. 2019.

References

External links
Patagonia Park Official Website
 Detailed for the Aviles Trail

Protected areas of Chile
Magellanic subpolar forests
2018 establishments in Chile
Protected areas established in 2018